New Hampton Township is one of twelve townships in Chickasaw County, Iowa, USA.  As of the 2000 census, its population was 3,065.

History
New Hampton Township was organized in 1857.

Geography
According to the USGS, it contains three cemeteries: Boyd, Saint Josephs and Union.

The stream of Plum Creek runs through this township.

Notes

References
 USGS Geographic Names Information System (GNIS)

External links
 US-Counties.com
 City-Data.com

Townships in Chickasaw County, Iowa
Townships in Iowa
1857 establishments in Iowa
Populated places established in 1857